Aspyr Media, Inc. (pronounced "aspire") is an American video game developer and publisher founded by Michael Rogers and Ted Staloch in Austin, Texas. Originally founded to bring top gaming titles to macOS, the company, since 2005, has become a publisher and developer of entertainment for multiple gaming platforms.

Aspyr was acquired by Embracer Group in February 2021 and placed within Saber Interactive.

History 
In 1996, Aspyr Media, Inc., was established by Michael Rogers and Ted Staloch in Austin, Texas. Staloch, who had a background in sales and marketing and Rogers, who worked with TechWorks, noticed that there was a lack of gaming titles available to Mac owners and set out to change it.  According to Rogers, when naming the company, they “wanted something meaning ‘to aspire and be great’” and also “memorable and unique.” Aspyr made its name specializing in porting video games from Microsoft Windows to macOS.

By 2003, they owned 60 percent of the Mac entertainment market. In 2005, Aspyr partnered with Alex Seropian of Wideload Games and released their first originally-published AAA game, Stubbs The Zombie, to Mac OS, Windows and Xbox. In 2015, Aspyr Media expanded their platform catalog again by releasing an iOS port of Star Wars: Knights of the Old Republic and later, Bioware's classic-action RPG, Jade Empire - a title they extended to Android as well. In 2015, Aspyr updated Star Wars Knights of the Old Republic II: The Sith Lords (native widescreen resolutions up to 5K, Steam Workshop, support for controllers, 57 achievements, etc.) and also ported it to macOS and Linux. In 2015, Aspyr developed and published Fahrenheit: Indigo Prophecy Remastered, a remaster of a game developed by Quantic Dream, to a worldwide audience with enhanced game features, updated visuals and controls, as well as content that was censored in the original North American release.

Aspyr has published over 190 games, and have added 90 plus members to their team since 1996. In February 2021, Aspyr was acquired by Embracer Group. The company was added as a studio under the Saber Interactive label within Embracer. In September 2021, it was announced that Aspyr was developing a remake of Knights of the Old Republic for Microsoft Windows and PlayStation 5 as a timed exclusive. In August 2022, Embracer announced that Aspyr is no longer working on the game and development has been moved to another studio.

On April 12, 2022, Aspyr announced that it would publish MythForce, the debut title from Canadian studio Beamdog. The following day, Embracer Group acquired Beamdog and placed it as a subsidiary of Aspyr.

Games 

Currently, Aspyr's catalog includes popular games such as Sid Meier's Civilization VI, developed in 2018 on Mac, Linux, iOS and Nintendo Switch, Torn, and the re-releases of Lucasfilm Games (LucasArts) titles: Star Wars Jedi Knight II: Jedi Outcast and Star Wars Jedi Knight: Jedi Academy.

References

External links

1996 establishments in Texas
2021 mergers and acquisitions
American companies established in 1996
Apple Design Awards recipients
Companies based in Austin, Texas
Linux companies
Linux game porters
Macintosh software companies
Saber Interactive
Video game companies based in Texas
Video game companies established in 1996
Video game development companies
Video game publishers